Hōjō Nagatoki (1227–1264) was the sixth Shikken (1256–1264) of the Kamakura Bakufu and the 4th Chief of the Rokuhara Tandai North Branch Kitakata.

1227 births
1264 deaths
Hōjō clan
People of Kamakura-period Japan